Thomas Kerridge (born 27 July 1973) is an English Michelin-starred chef who has worked mainly in the United Kingdom. After initially appearing in several small television parts as a child actor, he decided to attend culinary school at the age of 18. He has since worked at a variety of British restaurants, including the Michelin starred Rhodes in the Square and Adlards.

With his wife Beth Cullen-Kerridge, he opened the pub, The Hand & Flowers in 2005 and within a year gained his first Michelin star. In the 2012 list, he won a second Michelin star, the first time a pub had done so. Tom then went on to open a second pub in Marlow, The Coach, which has also won a Michelin star. More recently Tom opened The Butcher's Tap (butchers and pub under one roof) and opened his first London restaurant in 2018 at Corinthia Hotel London.

As a chef he has appeared on the Great British Menu, MasterChef and Saturday Kitchen and more recently fronted his own series How to Lose Weight For Good and Top of the Shop, both for BBC.

Kerridge  presented Bake Off: Crème de la Crème (2016) and currently presents Food and Drink (2015–present), both for BBC Two.

Early life
Kerridge, whose parents divorced when he was eleven, was the elder of two brothers. His mother held down several jobs while moving the now single-parent family around several housing estates in Gloucester. He attended Saintbridge Secondary School in the city, and began cooking for himself and his younger brother after school while his mother was at work. Kerridge enjoyed riding his bike and visiting Westonbirt Arboretum.

He attended a youth theatre for three weeks when he was spotted and cast in the 1991 Christmas special of the BBC1 television show Miss Marple: They Do It with Mirrors. A number of other small television roles followed, but at the age of eighteen he decided to pursue his love of cooking instead of an acting career. Kerridge found Marco Pierre White's White Heat cookbook inspiring, and states that it encouraged him to pursue a career as a chef by attending catering college in Cheltenham.

Career
His first role in a professional kitchen was as a commis chef at Calcot Manor in Tetbury in 1991. Tom went to work under renowned chef Philip Britten at the Capital hotel, Knightsbridge. This was followed with three years at the Stephen Bull restaurant in Marylebone.  He moved around several restaurants as a chef de partie before joining Rhodes in the Square as sous chef under Gary Rhodes in 1999.

He spent a further two years as sous chef at Odettes in London. In 2001 he became head chef for the first time, at Bellamys Dining Room, and then at Great Fosters in Surrey.

He moved back to London to become senior sous chef at Monsieur Max until 2003, before moving to Adlards in Norwich as head chef once more. In 2005 he opened his own gastropub, called The Hand & Flowers, which gained a Michelin star in 2006. The Hand & Flowers gained a second Michelin star in the 2012 list, becoming the first pub ever to hold two Michelin stars.

Kerridge describes himself as "not a Michelin-star kind of guy", which influenced his choice to open his gastropub. His signature dish is his take on a pig roast involving cooking pork belly in a bain-marie, which is then wrapped in skin and roasted. This is accompanied by a stuffed pig's trotter.

Kerridge has appeared on television in series five and six of the Great British Menu, supplying main courses to the final banquet on both occasions, and has subsequently appeared as a judge on the programme every year since competing and has also appeared on Saturday Kitchen.

In February 2013 he appeared as guest chef on the BBC programme Food and Drink. He later became the co-presenter of the show in 2015.

In 2013 he presented his own BBC Two food programme Tom Kerridge's Proper Pub Food and then in spring 2014, he hosted Spring Kitchen with Tom Kerridge, which was aired in a daytime viewing slot on BBC One. September 2013 saw Kerridge win the coveted AA Chefs' Chef of the Year Award at the AA Hospitality Awards at the London Hilton Hotel.

In January 2014, Kerridge's gastropub “The Hand and Flowers” was named the UK's top gastropub for the third consecutive year at the Budweiser Budvar Top 50 Gastropubs Awards.

September 2014 saw chef Kerridge win GQ's Chef Of The Year award at the GQ Men Of The Year awards held at the Royal Opera House in London's Covent Garden.

In 2016, Kerridge presented Bake Off: Crème de la Crème for BBC Two. He was replaced by Angus Deayton for the second series in 2017.

Kerridge co-presented the 2016 BBC Two series The Food Detectives with Sean Fletcher and Alice Roberts. In 2017 he co-presented The Best of British Takeaways with Cherry Healey on BBC Two. In 2017, he presented Tom Kerridge: Lose Weight For Good for BBC Two.

In 2017, Kerridge launched Pub in the Park in Marlow and continued the festival in 2018 in Marlow, Bath, Tunbridge Wells and Knutsford.

In 2017, Kerridge won the Chef Award at the Catey Awards. 

On 2 October 2017, Kerridge's Marlow pub, The Coach was awarded its first Michelin Star in the Michelin Guide Great Britain & Ireland 2018.

Kerridge has also launched his own catering business, LUSH by The Hand and Flowers, which launched in April 2018.

September 2018 saw the opening of Kerridge's first London restaurant called Kerridge’s Bar & Grill, at the Corinthia Hotel in Westminster. Head Chef was Nick Beardshaw, who had previously worked with Kerridge at The Hand and Flowers and The Coach.

In January 2019 he presented a BBC Two food programme called Tom Kerridge's Fresh Start.

On 19 September 2019, the chef's 10-part series called Tom Kerridge's American Feast, premiered on Food Network UK. The series sees Kerridge travel on a culinary road trip across America, from the Northern Californian Coast to the Florida Keys.

On 8 January 2020, the first episode of Kerridge's new 6-part TV series called Lose Weight and Get Fit with Tom Kerridge was screened on BBC2. A hardback book of the same name was released to accompany the series.

15 November 2019 saw the opening of Kerridge's latest restaurant called 'The Bull & Bear' at Manchester's Stock Exchange Hotel, which is owned by former footballers Gary Neville and Ryan Giggs, together with hotelier Winston Zahra.

On 30 July 2020, Kerridge's 12-part TV series called Tom Kerridge Barbecues premiered on Food Network UK.

In January 2021, Kerridge announced that he was teaming up with British Airways to create a new range of short haul economy food; part of the airline's Speedbird Café menu. Kerridge had previously worked with British Airways in 2019 to design new long-haul menus for customers travelling with the airline throughout August of that year; part of the airline's centenary celebrations.

On 6 September 2021, the BBC announced that Kerridge would be joining the judging panel for the next series of Great British Menu.

Controversy
On 7 November 2012, Kerridge was among a number of chefs who joined in the cyber-bullying of a customer to his associate Claude Bosi's restaurant Hibiscus. James Isherwood had written on his blog 'Dining With James' that he had not enjoyed his starter, leading Bosi and fellow Michelin star chef Sat Bains to verbally abuse him on Twitter.

Personal life
Kerridge does not cook often when at home and claims that his oven is the least-used appliance in his house.

Kerridge is a lifelong Manchester United supporter and has a number 7 tattoo in honor of his favourite player, Bryan Robson. He is also a season-ticket holder of Marlow F.C.

Kerridge is married to sculptor Beth Cullen-Kerridge; the couple have one child. He told author Paul Stenning: "My relationship with Beth is fantastic but in our first year living and working together she left me three times! It wasn’t what she was used to doing and for every penny you both own to be invested in the business, and for that to be virtually all you are doing with your time is hard. We had everything in our life in the one room and it was all above the place we were working, where I was putting in a 90 hour a week shift. It becomes a huge pressure on your relationship but it also cements it and makes it very strong. We’ve been through a lot together."

After turning 40 and weighing 30 stone (190.5 kg), Kerridge managed to lose 12 stone (76.2 kg) in five years through a combination of swimming, ditching alcohol, cutting down on carbs and using the dopamine diet (a type of diet that boosts your levels of the so-called 'happy hormone' so that it's easier to stick to your diet).

Restaurants owned or operated by Tom Kerridge

England

Filmography

Books
 Tom Kerridge's Proper Pub Food (17 December 2013) 
 Tom Kerridge’s Best Ever Dishes (23 October 2014) 
 Tom's Table: My Favourite Everyday Recipes (3 December 2015)  
 Tom Kerridge's Dopamine Diet (14 March 2017) 
 Lose Weight for Good (19 March 2019) 
 Lose Weight & Get Fit (14 January 2020) 
 The Hand & Flowers Cookbook (12 January 2021) 
 Tom Kerridge's Outdoor Cooking: The Ultimate Modern Barbecue Bible (27 May 2021) 
 Real Life Recipes (1 September 2022)

References

External references
Tom Kerridge – Official Website
The Hand and Flowers – Official Website
The Butcher's Tap – Official Website
The Coach – Official Website
LUSH by The Hand and Flowers – Official Website
 

Living people
1973 births
People from Salisbury
English chefs
English television chefs
Head chefs of Michelin starred restaurants
People from Gloucester
English food writers
British gastronomes